Pak Tai To Yan is a mountain in northern Hong Kong near Fanling. It is close to a similarly named peak called Tai To Yan. Pak Tai To Yan is 480 metres tall.

Geography 
On the northern foot of this mountain, the largest cemetery in Hong Kong, Wo Hop Shek Public Cemetery, is built.

Access 
Pak Tai To Yan is in Lam Tsuen Country Park in northern Hong Kong. It is hiked as part of the Razors Edge Ridge Hike which brings hikers to both Pak Tai To Yan and nearby Tai To Yan. Hikers can start their hike near Kadoorie Farm and finish a few hours later at Fanling MTR station or Wah Ming Estate Bus Terminus.

See also 

 List of mountains, peaks and hills in Hong Kong
 Tai To Yan

References